Pudunilaivayal  is a village in the Arimalamrevenue block of Pudukkottai district, Tamil Nadu, India.

Demographics 

As per the 2001 census, Pudunilaivayal had a total population of 1977 with 917 males and 1060 females. Out of the total population 1188 people were literate.

References

Villages in Pudukkottai district